The Congressional Pro-Trade Caucus (CPTC), founded by Democratic Congressman Henry Cuellar in 2009, during the 111th Congress.  Congressman Cuellar, a member of the coalition of Blue Dog Democrats, characterizes the group as Democrats and Republicans from all across the country, united by the belief that trade is the lifeblood of the global economy and that healthy trade is a prerequisite for economic recovery.   One of the primary issues of interest to the group is the NAFTA-Mexican trucking dispute.

See also

House trade working group
United States – Colombia Free Trade Agreement
Panama – United States Trade Promotion Agreement
South Korea – United States Free Trade Agreement
Trans-Pacific Strategic Economic Partnership
United States Trade Representative
Caucuses of the United States Congress
Congressional caucus
North American Free Trade Agreement

References

External links
 111th Congress Congressional Member Organizations (CMOs)
 Trade section of the Web site of Rep. Henry Cuellar
 Restoring the Pro-Trade Consensus, Cato Institute Web site, June 15, 2010 (includes video of event)
 National Foreign Trade Council U.S. Representative Henry Cuellar Launches Pro-Trade Caucus, Mar. 20, 2009

Free trade agreements of the United States
Foreign trade of the United States
Caucuses of the United States Congress